The Loud Kids Tour Gets Louder is the second concert tour by Italian group Måneskin, in support of their second and third studio albums, Teatro d'ira: Vol. I (2021) and Rush! (2023).

Tour dates

Cancelled dates

Notes

References

2022 concert tours
2023 concert tours
Concert tours of Europe
Concert tours of Mexico
Concert tours of North America
Concert tours of Japan
Concert tours of Spain
Concert tours of the United States